Rahamna is an Arabic tribe of Arab descent who settled north of the Sahara between the 13th and 15th centuries. In 1525, they mobilized with Mohammed esh-Sheikh to fight the Portuguese in Agadir, Mogador, Safi and Mazagan. In the second half of the 16th century, they inhabited a vast plain north of Marrakesh. They are related to the Yagout tribe, who live in the Western Sahara.,

See also 
 Maqil
 Beni Khirane
 Ahl Rachida
 Azwafit
 Marrakesh-Safi

References 

Arab tribes in Morocco